Lake Mezzano is a small crater lake of central Italy, of volcanic origin, which was formed 400,000 years ago.

The lake has a circular shape typical of crater lakes.  Its surface area is 475,000 m² the altitude of its surface is 452 m and has a perimeter of 2,516 m.

The emissary which leaves Lake Mezzano is river Olpeta, that is an affluent to Fiora.

The lake lies in the territory of the community of Valentano (VT).

In the 1980s an archaeologic campaign brought back to light a number of historical and prehistorical findings. Many of those are now exhibited in the Museo della Preistoria e della Rocca Farnese in Valentano.

Calderas of Italy
Volcanic crater lakes
Lakes of Lazio